Gir Somnath is a district of Gujarat, India. It is located on the southern corner of the Kathiawar peninsula with its headquarters at the city of Somnath.

Gir Somnath was split from Junagadh district in August 2013, when seven new districts came into existence in Gujarat.

Veraval, Talala, Sutrapada, Kodinar, Una and Gir-Gadhada are the talukas of Gir Somnath.

The Gir Forest is a home of many wildlife creatures including lions, deer, and monkeys. Asiatic Lions can be only be found in the Gir Forest.

Demographics

At the time of the 2011 census, Gir-Somnath district has a population of 1,217,477, of which 333,009 (27.35%) lived in urban areas. Gir-Somnath had a sex ratio of 964 females per 1000 males. Scheduled Castes and Scheduled Tribes made up 113,822 (9.35%) and 17,761 (1.46%) of the population respectively.

Hindus are 1,048,741 (86.14%) and Muslims 164,520 (13.52%) of the population respectively.

At the time of the 2011 census 96.09% of the population spoke Gujarati and 1.70% Hindi as their first language.

Politics
  

|}

See also

Notes and references

External links 

 Official website

Districts of Gujarat